The Bonding is the eighth studio album by the Austrian symphonic metal band Edenbridge. It was released in July 2013 on the SPV label after both singer Sabine Edelsbacher and the band's mastermind "Lanvall" Stockhammer had suffered personal losses. Bassist Wolfgang Rothbauer who formerly played for Disbelief and Zombie Inc. had joined Edenbridge for the recording.

Reception

The album received mixed to positive reviews. About.com interpreted the album and its track titles as a way of coping with Edelsbacher's and Stockhammer's family losses, and noted the band's professionalism and musical craftsmanship. In a split review by two authors, the German Rock Hard magazine lauded the song lines but also criticised the album for being kitschy and lacking guitar elements. The Sonic Seducer wrote that The Bonding surpassed the previous release MyEarthDream which was likewise recorded with a full symphonic orchestra.

Track listing

Personnel

Band members
Sabine Edelsbacher – vocals
Lanvall – lead and rhythm guitars, bass guitar, keyboards, piano, acoustic guitars, kacapi
Max Pointner – drums
Dominik Sebastian – lead and rhythm guitars
Wolfgang Rothbauer – bass guitar, grunts on "Shadows of my memory"

Guest musicians
Erik Martensson – lead vocals on "The Bonding"
Robby Valentine – backing vocals & choirs
Klangvereinigung orchestra

Production
Orchestral score by Lanvall
Produced by Lanvall
Mixed by Karl Groom
Mastered by Mika Jussila
Cover design by Anthony Clarkson
Layout design by Reinhard Schmid

References

2013 albums
Edenbridge (band) albums
SPV GmbH albums